Natica is a genus of small to medium-sized predatory sea snails, marine gastropods in the subfamily Naticinae of the family Naticidae, the moon snails. The genus was erected by Giovanni Antonio Scopoli in 1777.

The genus is known from the Eocene to the Recent periods (age range: 37.2 to 0.012 million years ago).

Species 
The World Register of Marine Species (WoRMS) includes the following species with accepted names in the genus Natica 

 Natica acinonyx Marche Marchad, 1957
 Natica adansoni Blainville, 1825
 Natica agulhasensis Thiele, 1925
 Natica albospira E. A. Smith, 1895
 Natica anosyensis Bozzetti, 2010
 Natica apertissima E. A. Smith, 1906
 Natica arachnoidea (Gmelin, 1791)
 Natica bibalteata G. B. Sowerby III, 1914
 Natica bouvieri Jousseaume, 1883
 Natica broderipiana Récluz, 1844
 Natica brunneolinea McLean, 1970
 Natica buriasiensis Récluz, 1844
 Natica cabrerai Kase & Shigeta, 2000
 Natica canariensis Odhner, 1932
 Natica candidula E. A. Smith, 1895
 Natica caneloensis Hertlein & Strong, 1955
 Natica castrensis (Dall, 1889)
 Natica colima Strong & Hertlein, 1937
 Natica collaria (Lamarck, 1822)
 Natica concavoperculata Liu, 1977
 Natica couteaudi Rochebrune & Mabille, 1885
 Natica crassoperculata X. Liu, 1977
 Natica crispata Thiele, 1925
 † Natica deshayesiana Nyst, 1845 
 Natica dimidiata E. A. Smith, 1906
 Natica dixoni Fernandes & Rolán, 1992
 † Natica elegans J. Sowerby, 1836 
 † Natica euthele Tournouër, 1874 
 Natica fabella Jousseaume, 1884
 Natica fasciata (Röding, 1798)
 Natica forata Reeve, 1855
 Natica forskalii G. B. Sowerby I, 1825
 Natica fulgurans Récluz, 1844
 Natica fulminea Gmelin, 1791
 Natica furva Watson, 1897
 Natica grayi Philippi, 1852
 Natica gruveli Dautzenberg, 1910
 Natica idiopoma Pilsbry & Lowe, 1932
 Natica inexpectans Olsson, 1971
 Natica juani Costa & Pastorino, 2012
 Natica jukyriuva Simone, 2014
 Natica kawamurai Sakurai, 1983
 Natica koperbergae van der Bijl & Moolenbeek, 2009
 Natica lacteobasis Kuroda, 1961
 Natica larvaroni P. Bernard, 1983
 Natica limbata d'Orbigny, 1837
 Natica linguifera Thiele, 1925
 Natica livida Pfeiffer, 1840
 Natica luculenta Iredale, 1929
 Natica lunaris (Berry, 1964)
 Natica marchadi Pin, 1992
 Natica marochiensis (Gmelin, 1791)
 † Natica matheroni Deshayes, 1864 
 Natica maxiutongi S.-P. Zhang, 2009
 Natica menkeana Philippi, 1851
 Natica michaelis Fischer-Piette, 1942
 Natica monodi Marche-Marchad, 1957
 Natica multipunctata Blainville, 1825
 Natica nipponensis Kuroda, 1961
 Natica oteroi (Fernandes & Rolán, 1991)
 Natica othello Dall, 1908
 Natica pavimentum Récluz, 1844
 Natica perlineata Dall, 1889
 Natica pipoca Simone, 2014
 Natica pluvialis (Kurono, 1999)
 Natica pseustes Watson, 1881
 Natica pulicaris Philippi, 1851
 † Natica pumila G. B. Sowerby I, 1846 
 Natica pygmaea Philippi, 1842
 Natica queketti G.B. Sowerby III, 1894
 Natica rocquignyi Fischer-Piette, 1942
 Natica rouxi Nicklès, 1952
 Natica royi Pin, 1992
 Natica rubromaculata E. A. Smith, 1872
 Natica ryalli Fernandes & Rolán, 1992
 Natica saitoi Kuroda & Habe, 1971
 Natica sanctaehelenae E. A. Smith, 1890
 Natica sandwichensis (Dall, 1895)
 Natica sansibarica Thiele, 1925
 Natica scethra Dall, 1908
 Natica schepmani Thiele, 1925
 Natica scopaespira Liu, 1977
 Natica seychellium Watson R.B., 1886
 Natica siberutensis Thiele, 1925
 Natica sigillata McLean, 1970
 Natica simplex G.B. Sowerby III, 1897
 Natica sinensis Ma & Zhang, 1993
 Natica spadicea (Gmelin, 1791)
 Natica spadiceoides Liu, 1977
 Natica stellata Hedley, 1913
 Natica stenopa Woodring, 1957
 † Natica subsolida d'Orbigny, 1847 
 † Natica suppleta Finlay, 1927 
 Natica tedbayeri Rehder, 1986
 † Natica tremarici Tate, 1900 
 Natica turtoni E. A. Smith, 1890
 Natica unibalteata Liu, 1977
 Natica unifasciata Lamarck, 1822
 Natica vitellus (Linnaeus, 1758)

Taxon inquirendum
 Natica gracilis Récluz, 1850
 Natica moquiniana Récluz, 1853
 Natica perscalpta Martens, 1878
 Natica swainsoni Philippi, 1851

Synonyms

 Subgenus Natica (Cryptonatica) Dall, 1892: synonym of Cryptonatica Dall, 1892
 Subgenus Natica (Eunaticina) P. Fischer, 1885: synonym of Eunaticina P. Fischer, 1885
 Subgenus Natica (Nacca) Risso, 1826: synonym of Natica Scopoli, 1777
 Subgenus Natica (Natica) Scopoli, 1777 represented as Natica Scopoli, 1777 (alternate representation)
 Subgenus Natica (Naticarius) Duméril, 1805: synonym of Naticarius Duméril, 1805
 Subgenus Natica (Notocochlis): synonym of Notocochlis Powell, 1933
 Subgenus Natica (Payraudeautia) Bucquoy, Dautzenberg & Dollfus, 1883: synonym of Payraudeautia Bucquoy, Dautzenberg & Dollfus, 1883
 Subgenus Natica (Polinices) Montfort, 1810 represented as Polinices Montfort, 1810
 Natica abyssicola E. A. Smith, 1896: synonym of Lunatia abyssicola (E. A. Smith, 1896): synonym of Euspira abyssicola (E. A. Smith, 1896)
 Natica acynonyx [sic]: synonym of Natica acinonyx Marche-Marchad, 1957
 Natica adspersa Menke, 1830: synonym of Naticarius hebraeus (Martyn, 1786)
 Natica affinis (Gmelin, 1791): synonym of Cryptonatica affinis (Gmelin, 1791)
 Natica africana Bartsch, 1915: synonym of Natica queketti Sowerby III, 1894
 Natica alapapilionis (Röding, 1798): synonym of Naticarius alapapilionis (Röding, 1798)
 Natica albifasciata Liu, 1977: synonym of Tanea albifasciata (X. Liu, 1977) (original combination)
 Natica albula Récluz, 1851: synonym of Polinices mammilla (Linnaeus, 1758)
 Natica alderi Forbes, 1838: synonym of Euspira pulchella (Risso, 1826)
 Natica aleutica Dall, 1919: synonym of Cryptonatica aleutica (Dall, 1919)
 Natica alfredensis Bartsch, 1915: synonym of Tectonatica tecta (Anton, 1838)
 Natica algida Gould, 1848: synonym of Cryptonatica affinis (Gmelin, 1791)
 Natica alveata Troschel, 1852: synonym of Polinices alveatus (Troschel, 1852)
 Natica amabilis Locard, 1897: synonym of Euspira subplicata (Jeffreys, 1885)
 Natica amiculata Philippi, 1849: synonym of Polinices amiculatus (Philippi, 1849)
 Natica amphiala Watson, 1881: synonym of Friginatica amphiala (Watson, 1881)
 Natica ampla Philippi, 1849: synonym of Glossaulax didyma ampla (Philippi, 1849)
 Natica ampullaria Lamarck, 1822: synonym of Euspira heros (Say, 1822)
 Natica anderssoni Strebel, 1906: synonym of Amauropsis anderssoni (Strebel, 1906)
 Natica angulata Jeffreys, 1885: synonym of Euspira fusca (Blainville, 1825)
 Natica antoni Philippi, 1851: synonym of Notocochlis gualteriana (Récluz, 1844)
 Natica aperta Lovén, 1846: synonym of Bulbus smithii T. Brown, 1839
 Natica apora Watson, 1881: synonym of Amauropsis apora (Watson, 1881)
 Natica areolata Récluz, 1844: synonym of Tanea areolata (Recluz, 1844)
 Natica asellus Reeve, 1855: synonym of Notocochlis gualteriana (Récluz, 1844)
 Natica atrocyanea Philippi, 1845: synonym of Natica limbata d'Orbigny, 1837
 Natica atypha Watson, 1881: synonym of Natica buriasiensis Récluz, 1844
 Natica aurantia Lamarck, 1822: synonym of Polinices aurantius (Röding, 1798)
 Natica aureolutea Strebel, 1908: synonym of Amauropsis aureolutea (Strebel, 1908)
 Natica aureozona Tomlin, 1921: synonym of Tectonatica tecta (Anton, 1838)
 Natica baconi Reeve, 1855: synonym of Conuber incei (Philippi, 1853)
 Natica bahiensis Récluz, 1850: synonym of Polinices hepaticus (Röding, 1798)
 Natica balteata G.B. Sowerby III, 1914: synonym of Notocochlis gualteriana (Récluz, 1844)
 Natica bathybii Friele, 1879: synonym of Cryptonatica bathybii (Friele, 1879)
 Natica bayeri Rehder, 1986: synonym of Natica tedbayeri Rehder, 1986
 Natica beddomei Johnston, 1885: synonym of Friginatica beddomei (Johnston, 1885)
 Natica bernardii Récluz, 1851: synonym of Mammilla bernardii (Récluz, 1851)
 Natica bicincta Récluz, 1850: synonym of Mammilla melanostomoides (Quoy & Gaimard, 1833)
 Natica bicolor Philippi, 1849: synonym of Glossaulax petiveriana (Récluz, 1843)
 Natica bifasciata Gray in Griffith & Pidgeon, 1833: synonym of Polinices bifasciatus (Gray in Griffith & Pidgeon, 1833)
 Natica bonplandi Valenciennes, 1832: synonym of Hypterita helicoides (Gray, 1825)
 Natica borealis Gray, 1839: synonym of Euspira pallida (Broderip & Sowerby, 1829)
 Natica bougei G.B. Sowerby III, 1908: synonym of Tectonatica bougei (G.B. Sowerby III, 1908); synonym of Tectonatica venustula (Philippi, 1851)
 Natica bourguignati Récluz, 1852: synonym of Natica fulminea (Gmelin, 1791)
 Natica brachya Locard, 1897: synonym of Amauropsis brassiculina (Locard, 1897)
 Natica brassiculina Locard, 1897: synonym of Amauropsis brassiculina (Locard, 1897)
 Natica brocchiana Philippi, 1851: synonym of Euspira fusca (Blainville, 1825)
 Natica brunnea Link, 1807: synonym of Polinices hepaticus (Röding, 1798)
 Natica brunoi P. Bernard, 1983: synonym of Natica rubromaculata E. A. Smith, 1872
 Natica bullula Locard, 1897: synonym of Amauropsis brassiculina (Locard, 1897)
 Natica burnupi E.A. Smith, 1903: synonym of  Notocochlis gualteriana (Récluz, 1844)
 Natica cailliaudii Récluz, 1850: synonym of Natica pavimentum Récluz, 1844
 Natica campeachiensis Récluz in Reeve, 1855: synonym of Neverita duplicata (Say, 1822)
 Natica campechiensis Récluz in Chenu, 1843: synonym of Neverita duplicata (Say, 1822)
 Natica canaliculata Gould, 1840: synonym of Amauropsis islandica (Gmelin, 1791)
 Natica cancellata Swainson, 1840: synonym of Sigaretus mammilaris Récluz in Chenu, 1843
 Natica candidissima Le Guillou, 1842: synonym of Polinices candidissimus (Le Guillou, 1842)
 Natica candidissima Récluz, 1851: synonym of Polinices porcelanus (d'Orbigny, 1839)
 Natica caprae Philippi, 1852: synonym of Mammilla caprae (Philippi, 1852)
 Natica caribaea Philippi, 1851: synonym of Polinices lacteus (Guilding, 1834)
 Natica carinifera Koch in Philippi, 1852: synonym of Natica vittata (Gmelin, 1791)
 Natica castanea Lamarck, 1822: synonym of Euspira catena (da Costa, 1778)
 Natica catena (da Costa, 1778) - necklace shell: synonym of Euspira catena (da Costa, 1778)
 Natica catenata Philippi, 1853: synonym of Natica grayi Philippi, 1852
 Natica catenata Locard, 1886: synonym of Euspira catena (da Costa, 1778)
 Natica caurina Gould, 1847: synonym of Euspira pallida (Broderip & Sowerby, 1829)
 Natica cayennensis Récluz, 1850: synonym of Stigmaulax cayennensis (Récluz, 1850)
 Natica cernica Jousseaume, 1874: synonym of Notocochlis cernica (Jousseaume, 1874)
 Natica chemnitzii Récluz in Reeve, 1885: synonym of Neverita aulacoglossa (Pilsbry & Vanatta, 1909)
 Natica chemnitzii Récluz in Chenu, 1843: synonym of Neverita didyma (Röding, 1798)
 Natica chemnitzii L. Pfeiffer, 1840: synonym of Notocochlis chemnitzii (L. Pfeiffer, 1840)
 Natica chinensis Lamarck, 1816: synonym of Naticarius onca (Röding, 1798)
 Natica cincta Récluz, 1850: synonym of Natica pulicaris Philippi, 1851
 Natica cinnamomea Menke, 1830: synonym of Natica fasciata (Röding, 1798)
 Natica citrina Philippi, 1851: synonym of Polinices citrinus (Philippi, 1851)
 Natica clausa Broderip & Sowerby G.B. I, 1829: synonym of Cryptonatica affinis (Gmelin, 1791)
 Natica clausiformis (Oyama, 1969): synonym of Cryptonatica affinis (Gmelin, 1791)
 Natica clavata G. B. Sowerby II, 1883: synonym of Polinices peselephanti (Link, 1807)
 Natica collei [sic]: synonym of Naticarius colliei (Récluz, 1844)
 Natica colliei Récluz, 1844: synonym of Naticarius colliei (Récluz, 1844)
 Natica columnaris Récluz, 1850: synonym of Polinices peselephanti (Link, 1807)
 Natica compacta Jeffreys, 1885: synonym of Euspira fusca (Blainville, 1825)
 Natica complanata Locard, 1886: synonym of Euspira nitida (Donovan, 1804)
 Natica conica Lamarck, 1822: synonym of Conuber conicum (Lamarck, 1822)
 Natica consolidata Couthouy, 1838: synonym of Cryptonatica affinis (Gmelin, 1791)
 Natica cora d'Orbigny, 1840: synonym of Polinices cora (d'Orbigny, 1840)
 Natica cornea Möller, 1842: synonym of Amauropsis islandica (Gmelin, 1791)
 Natica costulata Quoy & Gaimard, 1833: synonym of Eunaticina papilla (Gmelin, 1791)
 Natica crassa Schepman, 1909: synonym of Natica arachnoidea (Gmelin, 1791)
 Natica crassatella Locard, 1886: synonym of Euspira intricata (Donovan, 1804)
 Natica crosseana Weinkauff, 1868: synonym of Megalomphalus azoneus (Brusina, 1865)
 Natica cruentata Lamarck, 1822: synonym of Natica fulminea (Gmelin, 1791)
 Natica cubana Dall, 1927: synonym of Stigmaulax sulcatus (Born, 1778)
 Natica cumingiana Récluz, 1844: synonym of Vanikoro cumingiana (Récluz, 1844)
 Natica cygnea Philippi, 1852: synonym of Polinices mammilla (Linnaeus, 1758)
 Natica cymba Menke, 1828: synonym of Sinum cymba (Menke, 1828)
 Natica decipiens E.A. Smith, 1904: synonym of Natica simplex Sowerby, 1897
 Natica deiodosa Reeve, 1855: synonym of Polinices aurantius (Röding, 1798)
 Natica delessertiana Récluz, 1843: synonym of Neverita delessertiana (Récluz, 1843)
 Natica delicatula E. A. Smith, 1902: synonym of Kerguelenatica delicatula (E. A. Smith, 1902)
 Natica depressa Gray, 1839: synonym of Natica grayi Philippi, 1852
 Natica didyma Bolten: synonym of Polinices didyma (Röding, 1798)
 Natica dillwynii Payraudeau, 1826: synonym of Notocochlis dillwynii (Payraudeau, 1826)
 Natica donghaiensis Ma & Zhang, 1994: synonym of Naticarius donghaiensis (X.-T. Ma & S.-P. Zhang, 2003)
 Natica draparnaudii Récluz, 1851: synonym of Polinices aurantius (Röding, 1798)
 Natica dubia Récluz, 1844: synonym of Polinices constanti Huelsken & Hollmann, 2012
 Natica duplicata Say, 1822: synonym of Neverita duplicata (Say, 1822)
 Natica eburnea Deshayes, 1838: synonym of Naticarius orientalis (Gmelin, 1791)
 Natica effosa Watson, 1886: synonym of Friginatica beddomei (Johnston, 1885)
 Natica elegans Récluz, 1850: synonym of Natica picta Récluz, 1844
 Natica elenae Récluz, 1844: synonym of Stigmaulax elenae (Récluz, 1844)
 Natica elkingtoni Hedley & May, 1908: synonym of Tectonatica shorehami (Pritchard & Gatliff, 1900)
 Natica euzona Recluz, 1844: synonym of Tanea euzona (Recluz, 1844)
 Natica extenta Locard, 1897: synonym of Euspira subplicata (Jeffreys, 1885)
 Natica exulans Gould, 1841: synonym of Amauropsis islandica (Gmelin, 1791)
 Natica falklandica Preston, 1913: synonym of Falsilunatia falklandica (Preston, 1913)
 Natica fanel Recluz, 1844: synonym of Natica multipunctata Fischer-Piette, 1942
 Natica fanel (Röding, 1798): synonym of Natica hebraea (Martyn, 1786), synonym of Naticarius hebraeus (Martyn, 1786)
 Natica fartilis Watson, 1881: synonym of Falsilunatia fartilis (Watson, 1881)
 Natica fibrosa Gray, 1850: synonym of Mammilla fibrosa (Gray, 1850)
 Natica fibrosa Souleyet, 1852: synonym of Natica fibrosa Gray, 1850: synonym of Mammilla fibrosa (Gray, 1850)
 Natica fibula Reeve, 1855: synonym of Conuber incei (Philippi, 1853)
 Natica filosa Reeve, 1855: synonym of Mammilla fibrosa (Gray, 1850)
 Natica filosa Philippi, 1845: synonym of Tectonatica sagraiana (d'Orbigny, 1842)
 Natica flammulata Requien, 1848: synonym of Tectonatica sagraiana (d'Orbigny, 1842)
 Natica flava Gould, 1839: synonym of Bulbus smithii T. Brown, 1839
 Natica flemingiana Récluz, 1844: synonym of Polinices flemingianus (Recluz, 1844)
 Natica fortunei Reeve, 1855: synonym of Laguncula pulchella Benson, 1842
 Natica fossar Bucquoy, Dautzenberg & Dollfus, 1884: synonym of Fossarus ambiguus (Linnaeus, 1758)
 Natica fossata Gould, 1847: synonym of Neverita delessertiana (Récluz, 1843)
 Natica fragilis Leach, 1819: synonym of Bulbus fragilis (Leach, 1819)
 Natica fringilla Dall, 1881: synonym of Euspira fringilla (Dall, 1881)
 Natica fulminea cruentata (Gmelin, 1790): synonym of Natica fulminea (Gmelin, 1790)
 Natica funiculata Récluz, 1850: synonym of Polinices peselephanti (Link, 1807)
 Natica fusca Blainville, 1825: synonym of Euspira fusca (Blainville, 1825)
 Natica fuscata Récluz, 1844: synonym of Polinices hepaticus (Röding, 1798)
 Natica galactites Philippi, 1851: synonym of Polinices flemingianus (Recluz, 1844)
 Natica gallapagosa Récluz, 1844: synonym of Polinices otis (Broderip & Sowerby, 1829)
 Natica gambiae Récluz, 1844: synonym of Natica collaria Lamarck, 1822
 Natica genuana Reeve, 1855: synonym of Tectonatica tecta (Anton, 1838)
 Natica georgiana Strebel, 1908: synonym of Amauropsis georgiana (Strebel, 1908)
 Natica gilva Philippi, 1851: synonym of Laguncula pulchella Benson, 1842
 Natica glauca Lesson, 1830: synonym of Hypterita helicoides (Gray, 1825)
 Natica globosa Jeffreys, 1885: synonym of Semicassis saburon (Bruguière, 1792)
 Natica godfroyi Lamy, 1910: synonym of Amauropsis godfroyi (Lamy, 1910)
 Natica gouldii C. B. Adams, 1847: synonym of Amauropsis islandica (Gmelin, 1791)
 Natica grisea Martens, 1878: synonym of Kerguelenatica bioperculata Dell, 1990: synonym of Kerguelenatica delicatula (E. A. Smith, 1902)
 Natica grisea Requien, 1848: synonym of Euspira intricata (Donovan, 1804)
 Natica groenlandica Beck, 1847: synonym of Euspira montagui (Forbes, 1838)
 Natica groenlandica Möller, 1842: synonym of Euspira pallida (Broderip & Sowerby, 1829)
 Natica gruneriana Philippi, 1852: synonym of Polinices grunerianus (Philippi, 1852)
 Natica gruveli Dautzenberg, 1910: synonym of Payraudeautia gruveli (Dautzenberg, 1910)
 Natica gualteriana Récluz, 1844: synonym of Notocochlis gualteriana Récluz, 1844
 Natica gualtieriana Couturier, 1907: synonym of Natica gualteriana Récluz, 1844
 Natica guesti Harasewych & Jensen, 1984: synonym of Notocochlis guesti (Harasewych & Jensen, 1984)
 Natica guilleminii Payraudeau, 1826: synonym of Euspira guilleminii (Payraudeau, 1826)
 Natica haneti Récluz, 1850: synonym of Stigmaulax elenae (Récluz, 1844)
 Natica hannanensis Liu, 1977: synonym of Naticarius hainanensis (X. Liu, 1977)
 Natica haweraensis Marwick, 1924: synonym of † Taniella planisuturalis (Marwick, 1924)
 Natica hebraea (Martyn, 1784): synonym of Naticarius hebraeus (Martyn, 1786)
 Natica helicoides Johnston, 1835: synonym of Amauropsis islandica (Gmelin, 1791)
 Natica helicoides Gray, 1825: synonym of Hypterita helicoides (Gray, 1825)
 Natica helvacea Lamarck, 1822: synonym of Natica spadicea (Gmelin, 1791)
 Natica heros Say, 1822: synonym of Euspira heros (Say, 1822)
 Natica hilaris G. B. Sowerby, 1914: synonym of Tanea hilaris (G. B. Sowerby, III, 1914)
 Natica hirasei Pilsbry, 1905: synonym of Cryptonatica hirasei (Pilsbry, 1905)
 Natica immaculata Totten, 1835: synonym of Polinices immaculatus (Totten, 1835)
 Natica imperforata Gray, 1839: synonym of Tectonatica tecta (Anton, 1838)
 Natica imperforata Jay, 1836: synonym of Globularia fluctuata (G.B. Sowerby I, 1825)
 Natica impervia Philippi, 1845: synonym of Tectonatica impervia (Philippi, 1845)
 Natica incei Philippi, 1853: synonym of Conuber incei (Philippi, 1853)
 Natica incisa Philippi, 1852: synonym of Glossaulax vesicalis (Philippi, 1849)
 Natica insecta Jousseaume, 1874: synonym of Naticarius insecta (Jousseaume, 1874)
 Natica insularum Watson, 1886: synonym of Notocochlis insularum (Watson, 1886)
 Natica intemerata Philippi, 1853: synonym of Polinices intemeratus (Philippi, 1853)
 Natica intermedia Récluz, 1843: synonym of Polinices mammilla (Linnaeus, 1758)
 Natica intermedia Philippi, 1836: synonym of Euspira nitida (Donovan, 1804)
 Natica intricata (Donovan, 1804): synonym of Euspira intricata (Donovan, 1804)
 Natica intricatoides Hidalgo, 1873: synonym of Natica vittata (Gmelin, 1791)
 Natica isabelleana d'Orbigny, 1840: synonym of Notocochlis isabelleana (d'Orbigny, 1840)
 Natica jamaicensis C. B. Adams, 1850: synonym of Natica livida Pfeiffer, 1840
 Natica josephinia (Risso, 1826): synonym of Neverita josephinia Risso, 1826
 Natica joubini Lamy, 1911: synonym of Falsilunatia joubini (Lamy, 1911)
 Natica jousseaumei Euthyme, 1885: synonym of Notocochlis cernica (Jousseaume, 1874)
 Natica jukesii Reeve, 1855: synonym of Polinices jukesii (Reeve, 1855)
 Natica kempi Preston, 1916: synonym of Natica buriasiensis Récluz, 1844
 Natica kingensis May, 1924: synonym of Laevilitorina kingensis (May, 1924)
 Natica kowiensis Turton, 1932: synonym of Natica simplex Sowerby III, 1897
 Natica kraussi E. A. Smith, 1902: synonym of Eunaticina kraussi (E. A. Smith, 1902)
 Natica labrella Lamarck, 1822: synonym of Natica collaria Lamarck, 1822
 Natica labrotincta Sowerby, 1900: synonym of Tectonatica suffusa (Reeve, 1855)
 Natica lacernula d'Orbigny, 1842: synonym of Natica livida Pfeiffer, 1840
 Natica lactea (Guilding, 1834): synonym of Polinices lacteus (Guilding, 1834)
 Natica laevis Hutton, 1885: synonym of Globisinum drewi (Murdoch, 1899)
 Natica lamarckiana Récluz in Reeve, 1855: synonym of Neverita didyma (Röding, 1798)
 Natica lamarckii Récluz in Chenu, 1843: synonym of Neverita didyma (Röding, 1798)
 Natica largillierti Récluz, 1852 accepted as Bulbus fragilis (Leach, 1819)
 Natica lavendula Woolacott, 1956: synonym of Natica pseustes Watson, 1881
 Natica lemnisciata Philippi, 1852: synonym of Natica marochiensis (Gmelin, 1791)
 Natica leptalea Watson, 1881: synonym of Polinices leptaleus (Watson, 1881)
 Natica leucophaea Reeve, 1855: synonym of Conuber sordidum (Swainson, 1821)
 Natica levicula A. E. Verrill, 1880: synonym of Euspira levicula (A. E. Verrill, 1880)
 Natica levis E. A. Smith, 1896: synonym of Euspira levis (E. A. Smith, 1896)
 Natica lewisii Gould, 1847: synonym of Neverita lewisii (Gould, 1847)
 Natica limacina Jousseaume, 1874: synonym of Natica marochiensis (Gmelin, 1791)
 Natica lineata (Röding, 1798): synonym of Tanea lineata (Röding, 1798)
 Natica lineolata Philippi, 1844: synonym of Tectonatica sagraiana (d'Orbigny, 1842)
 Natica lineozona Jousseaume, 1874: synonym of Naticarius lineozonus (Jousseaume, 1874)
 Natica listeri Philippi, 1850: synonym of Neverita duplicata (Say, 1822)
 Natica litterata Link, 1807: synonym of Naticarius onca (Röding, 1798)
 Natica locellus Reeve, 1855: synonym of Notocochlis gualteriana (Récluz, 1844)
 Natica lupinus Deshayes, 1838: synonym of Natica fasciata (Röding, 1798)
 Natica macilenta Philippi, 1844: synonym of Euspira macilenta (Philippi, 1844)
 Natica macrostoma Philippi, 1852: synonym of Mammilla melanostomoides (Quoy & Gaimard, 1832)
 Natica macrotremis A. Adams & Reeve, 1850: synonym of Eunaticina umbilicata (Quoy & Gaimard, 1832)
 Natica maculata von Salis, 1793: synonym of Naticarius hebraeus (Martyn, 1786)
 Natica maculata Deshayes, 1838: synonym of Naticarius hebraeus (Martyn, 1786)
 Natica maculosa Lamarck, 1822: synonym of Paratectonatica tigrina (Röding, 1798)
 Natica magnifluctuata Kuroda, 1961: synonym of Tanea magnifluctuata (Kuroda, 1961)
 Natica maheense Reeve, 1855: synonym of Natica seychellium Watson, 1886
 Natica mamilla (Linnaeus, 1758): synonym of Polinices mammilla (Linnaeus, 1758)
 Natica manceli Jousseaume, 1874: synonym of Naticarius manceli (Jousseaume, 1874)
 Natica marmorata Risso, 1826: synonym of Euspira guilleminii (Payraudeau, 1826)
 Natica marmorata H. Adams, 1869: synonym of Natica prietoi Hidalgo, 1873
 Natica maura Lamarck, 1816: synonym of Mammilla maura (Lamarck, 1816)
 Natica melanochila Philippi, 1852: synonym of Mammilla melanostoma (Gmelin, 1791)
 Natica melanoperculata Liu, 1977: synonym of Naticarius melanoperculatus (X. Liu, 1977)
 Natica melanostomoides Quoy & Gaimard, 1832: synonym of Mammilla melanostomoides (Quoy & Gaimard, 1832)
 Natica melanostoma (Gmelin, 1791): synonym of Mammilla melanostoma (Gmelin, 1791)
 Natica micra Haas, 1953: synonym of Tectonatica micra (Haas, 1953)
 Natica microstoma Quoy & Gaimard, 1833: synonym of Conuber sordidum (Swainson, 1821)
 Natica millepunctata Lamarck: synonym of Natica stercusmuscarum (Gmelin, 1791)
 Natica mittrei Hombron & Jacquinot, 1853: synonym of Polinices citrinus (Philippi, 1851)
 Natica monilifera Lamarck, 1822: synonym of Euspira catena (da Costa, 1778)
 Natica montacuti Jeffreys, 1867: synonym of Euspira montagui (Forbes, 1838)
 Natica montagui Forbes, 1838: synonym of Euspira montagui (Forbes, 1838)
 Natica mozaica Sowerby, 1883: synonym of Tanea mozaica (Sowerby, 1883)
 Natica nana Møller, 1842: synonym of Pseudopolinices nanus (Møller, 1842)
 Natica napus E.A. Smith, 1904: synonym of Euspira napus (E.A. Smith, 1904)
 Natica nebulosa Schepman, 1909: synonym of Notocochlis cernica (Jousseaume, 1874)
 Natica nemo Bartsch, 1915: synonym of Notocochlis gualteriana (Récluz, 1844)
 Natica neustriaca Locard, 1886: synonym of Euspira nitida (Donovan, 1804)
 Natica nigromaculata Lamy, 1911: synonym of Falsilunatia nigromaculata (Lamy, 1911)
 Natica nitida (Donovan, 1804): synonym of Euspira nitida (Donovan, 1804)
 Natica notabilis Jeffreys, 1885: synonym of Euspira notabilis (Jeffreys, 1885)
 Natica nubila Dall, 1889: synonym of Payraudeautia nubila (Dall, 1889)
 Natica nucula Reeve, 1855: synonym of Tectonatica suffusa (Reeve, 1855)
 Natica nukahivensis Jardin, 1859: synonym of Naticarius zonalis (Récluz, 1850)
 Natica obtusa Jeffreys, 1885: synonym of Euspira obtusa (Jeffreys, 1885)
 Natica ochrostigmata Rehder, 1980: synonym of Notocochlis cernica (Jousseaume, 1874)
 Natica olivella Locard, 1897: synonym of Amauropsis brassiculina (Locard, 1897)
 Natica olla de Serres, 1829: synonym of Neverita josephinia Risso, 1826
 Natica ochrostoma Récluz, 1850: synonym of Polinices lacteus (Guilding, 1834)
 Natica omoia Mabille & Rochebrune, 1885 †: synonym of Glossaulax secunda (Rochebrune & Mabille, 1885) †
 Natica onca (Röding, 1798): synonym of Naticarius onca (Röding, 1798)
 Natica opaca Récluz, 1851: synonym of Mammilla melanostoma (Gmelin, 1791)
 Natica operculata Jeffreys, 1885: synonym of Cryptonatica operculata (Jeffreys, 1885)
 Natica orientalis (Gmelin, 1791): synonym of Naticarius orientalis (Gmelin, 1791)
 Natica otis Broderip & G. B. Sowerby I, 1829: synonym of Polinices otis (Broderip & G. B. Sowerby I, 1829)
 Natica ovata G. B. Sowerby III, 1914: synonym of Lunatia pila ovata (G. B. Sowerby III, 1914)
 Natica ovum Menke, 1850: synonym of Polinices uber (Valenciennes, 1832)
 Natica pallida Broderip & Sowerby, 1829: synonym of Euspira pallida (Broderip & Sowerby, 1829)
 Natica pallium Récluz, 1850: synonym of Vanikoro cumingiana (Récluz, 1844)
 Natica panamaensis Récluz, 1844: synonym of Polinices panamaensis (Récluz, 1844)
 Natica papilla (Gmelin, 1791): synonym of Eunaticina papilla (Gmelin, 1791)
 Natica papyracea von den Busch, 1845: synonym of Neverita didyma (Röding, 1798)
 Natica parvula Tapparone Canefri, 1869: synonym of Euspira nitida (Donovan, 1804)
 Natica patagonica Philippi, 1845: synonym of Falsilunatia patagonica (Philippi, 1845)
 Natica patula G.B. Sowerby I, 1824: synonym of Hypterita helicoides (Gray, 1825)
 Natica payeni Rochebrune & Mabille, 1885: synonym of Tectonatica impervia (Philippi, 1845)
 Natica peselephanti Link, 1807: synonym of Polinices peselephanti (Link, 1807)
 Natica petiveriana Récluz in Chenu, 1843: synonym of Neverita didyma (Röding, 1798)
 Natica pfeifferi Philippi, 1851: synonym of Polinices lacteus (Guilding, 1834)
 Natica phaeocephala Dautzenberg & Fischer H., 1896: synonym of Euspira phaeocephala (Dautzenberg & H. Fischer, 1896)
 Natica philippiana Récluz in Chenu, 1843: synonym of Neverita josephinia Risso, 1826
 Natica philippiana Reeve, 1855: synonym of Neverita josephinia Risso, 1826
 Natica phytelephas Reeve, 1855: synonym of Polinices candidissimus (Le Guillou, 1842)
 Natica picta Recluz, 1843: synonym of Tanea picta (Récluz, 1844)
 Natica plicatula Reeve, 1855: synonym of Euspira fusca (Blainville, 1825)
 Natica plumbea Lamarck, 1822: synonym of Conuber sordidum (Swainson, 1821)
 Natica poliana Delle Chiaje, 1826: synonym of Euspira nitida (Donovan, 1804)
 Natica pomum Philippi, 1851: synonym of Euspira heros (Say, 1822)
 Natica ponderosa Philippi, 1852: synonym of Polinices mammilla (Linnaeus, 1758)
 Natica ponsonbyi Melvill, 1899: synonym of Natica vitellus (Linnaeus, 1758)
 Natica porcelana d'Orbigny, 1840: synonym of Polinices lacteus (Guilding, 1834)
 Natica powisiana Récluz, 1844: synonym of Polinices peselephanti (Link, 1807)
 Natica prasina Watson, 1881: synonym of Amauropsis prasina (Watson, 1881)
 Natica priamus Récluz, 1844: synonym of Mammilla priamus (Récluz, 1844)
 Natica prietoi (Hidalgo, 1873): synonym of Tectonatica prietoi (Hidalgo, 1873)
 Natica pritchardi Forbes, 1850: synonym of Natica chemnitzii L. Pfeiffer, 1840
 Natica problematica Reeve, 1855: synonym of Glossaulax vesicalis (Philippi, 1849)
 Natica prosistens Locard, 1897: synonym of Euspira subplicata (Jeffreys, 1885)
 Natica psila Watson, 1886: synonym of Polinices psilus (Watson, 1886)
 Natica puella Philippi, 1852: synonym of Polinices lacteus (Guilding, 1834)
 Natica pulchella Risso, 1826: synonym of Euspira pulchella (Risso, 1826)
 Natica pulicaris Philippi, 1842: synonym of Natica cincta Récluz, 1850
 Natica purpurea Dall, 1871: synonym of Amauropsis islandica (Gmelin, 1791)
 Natica pusilla Say, 1822: synonym of Tectonatica pusilla (Say, 1822)
 Natica pusilla Gould, 1841: synonym of Euspira pallida (Broderip & Sowerby, 1829)
 Natica pyramis Reeve, 1855: synonym of Conuber conicum (Lamarck, 1822)
 Natica pyriformis Récluz, 1844: synonym of Polinices mammilla (Linnaeus, 1758)
 Natica pyrrhosticta Dautzenberg & H. Fischer, 1896: synonym of Tectonatica rizzae (Philippi, 1844)
 Natica ranzii Kuroda, 1961: synonym of Cryptonatica hirasei (Pilsbry, 1905)
 Natica rapulum Reeve, 1855: synonym of Polinices intemeratus (Philippi, 1853)
 Natica ravida Souleyet, 1852: synonym of Polinices amiculatus (Philippi, 1849)
 Natica raynaudiana: synonym of Natica raynoldiana Récluz, 1844
 Natica raynoldiana Récluz, 1844: synonym of Natica arachnoidea (Gmelin, 1791)
 Natica reclusiana Deshayes, 1839: synonym of Neverita reclusiana (Deshayes, 1839)
 Natica recognita Mabille & Rochebrune, 1889: synonym of Falsilunatia patagonica (Philippi, 1845)
 Natica reneae Saunders, 1978: synonym of Natica canariensis Odhner, 1932
 Natica rhodostoma Philippi, 1842: synonym of Tectonatica violacea (G. B. Sowerby I, 1825)
 Natica rizzae Philippi, 1844: synonym of Tectonatica rizzae (Philippi, 1844)
 Natica robillardi Sowerby, 1893: synonym of Tectonatica robillardi (Sowerby III, 1894)
 Natica roscoei Kilburn, 1976: synonym of Natica buriasiensis Récluz, 1844
 Natica rufa Born, 1778: synonym of Natica vitellus (Linnaeus, 1758)
 Natica rufilabris Reeve, 1855: synonym of Natica livida Pfeiffer, 1840
 Natica russa Gould, 1859: synonym of Cryptonatica affinis (Gmelin, 1791)
 Natica russa Dall, 1874: synonym of Cryptonatica affinis (Gmelin, 1791)
 Natica rutila MacGillivray, 1843: synonym of Euspira montagui (Forbes, 1838)
 Natica sagittata Menke, 1843: synonym of Tanea sagittata (Menke, 1843)
 Natica sagittifera Récluz, 1852: synonym of Natica alapapilionis (Röding, 1798)
 Natica sagraiana d'Orbigny, 1842: synonym of Tectonatica sagraiana (d'Orbigny, 1842)
 Natica salangonensis Récluz, 1844: synonym of Polinices otis (Broderip & Sowerby, 1829)
 Natica saldontiana Bartsch, 1915: synonym of Natica simplex Sowerby III, 1897
 Natica samarensis Récluz, 1844: synonym of Mammilla simiae (Deshayes, 1838)
 Natica sanctivincentii Brooks, 1933: synonym of Polinices lacteus (Guilding, 1834)
 Natica sanguinolenta Deshayes, 1839: synonym of Conuber melastoma (Swainson, 1821)
 Natica sanguinolenta Brusina, 1865: synonym of Naticarius stercusmuscarum (Gmelin, 1791)
 Natica schoutanica May, 1913: synonym of Tasmatica schoutanica (May, 1913)
 Natica sculpta Martens, 1878: synonym of Sinuber sculptum (Martens, 1878)
 Natica sebae Récluz, 1844: synonym of Mammilla sebae (Récluz, 1844)
 Natica secunda Rochebrune and Mabille, 1885: synonym of Glossaulax secunda (Rochebrune and Mabille, 1885) 
 Natica senegalensis Récluz, 1850: synonym of Natica fulminea (Gmelin, 1791)
 Natica septentrionalis Møller, 1842: synonym of Cryptonatica affinis (Gmelin, 1791)
 Natica settepassii Gaglini in Settepassi, 1985: synonym of Tectonatica rizzae (Philippi, 1844)
 Natica shorehami Pritchard & Gatliff, 1900: synonym of Tectonatica shorehami (Pritchard & Gatliff, 1900)
 Natica sigaretina Menke, 1828: synonym of Mammilla simiae (Deshayes, 1838)
 Natica simiae Deshayes, 1838: synonym of Mammilla simiae (Deshayes, 1838)
 Natica simplex Schepman, 1909: synonym of Natica schepmani Thiele, 1925
 Natica simulans E. A. Smith, 1906: synonym of Uberella simulans (E. A. Smith, 1906)
 Natica solida Blainville, 1825: synonym of Natica fasciata (Röding, 1798)
 Natica soluta Gould, 1848: synonym of Falsilunatia patagonica (Philippi, 1845)
 Natica sordida Swainson, 1821: synonym of Conuber sordidum (Swainson, 1821)
 Natica sordida Philippi, 1844: synonym of Euspira fusca (Blainville, 1825)
 Natica souleyetiana Récluz, 1850: synonym of Tanea zelandica (Quoy & Gaimard, 1832)
 Natica sphaeroides Jeffreys, 1877: synonym of Amauropsis sphaeroides (Jeffreys, 1877)
 Natica squalida MacGillivray, 1843: synonym of Euspira montagui (Forbes, 1838)
 Natica stercusmuscarum (Gmelin, 1791): synonym of Naticarius stercusmuscarum (Gmelin, 1791)
 Natica stimpsoni Bartsch, 1915: synonym of Tectonatica tecta (Anton, 1838)
 Natica straminea Récluz, 1844: synonym of Polinices aurantius (Röding, 1798)
 Natica strangei Reeve, 1855: synonym of Conuber sordidum (Swainson, 1821)
 Natica strongyla Melvill, 1897: synonym of Naticarius manceli (Jousseaume, 1874)
 Natica subpallescens Strebel, 1908: synonym of Amauropsis subpallescens (Strebel, 1908)
 Natica subplicata Jeffreys, 1885: synonym of Euspira subplicata (Jeffreys, 1885)
 Natica succineoides Reeve, 1855: synonym of Mammilla melanostoma (Gmelin, 1791)
 Natica suffusa Reeve, 1855: synonym of Tectonatica suffusa (Reeve, 1855)
 Natica sulphurea Récluz, 1844: synonym of Polinices aurantius (Röding, 1798)
 Natica supraornata Schepman, 1909: synonym of Natica buriasiensis Récluz, 1844
 Natica taeniata Menke, 1830: synonym of Naticarius alapapilionis (Röding, 1798)
 Natica taslei Récluz, 1853: synonym of Natica broderipiana Récluz, 1844
 Natica tasmanica Tenison-Woods, 1876: synonym of Conuber conicum (Lamarck, 1822)
 Natica tecta Anton H.E., 1838: synonym of Tectonatica tecta (Anton, 1838)
 Natica telaaraneae Melvill, 1901: synonym of Natica buriasiensis Récluz, 1844
 Natica tenuicula G. B. Sowerby III, 1915: synonym of Bulbus tenuiculus (G. B. Sowerby III, 1915)
 Natica tenuipicta Kuroda, 1961: synonym of Tanea tenuipicta (Kuroda, 1961)
 Natica tenuis Philippi, 1852: synonym of Laguncula pulchella Benson, 1842
 Natica tenuis Récluz, 1851: synonym of Euspira tenuis (Récluz, 1851)
 Natica tenuistriata Dautzenberg & H. Fischer, 1911: synonym of Euspira tenuistriata (Dautzenberg & H. Fischer, 1911)
 Natica tessellata Philippi, 1849: synonym of Notocochlis gualteriana (Récluz, 1844)
 Natica texasiana Philippi, 1849: synonym of Neverita delessertiana (Récluz, 1843)
 Natica textilis Reeve, 1855: synonym of Natica vittata (Gmelin, 1791)
 Natica tigrina (Röding, 1798): synonym of Notocochlis tigrina (Röding, 1798)
 Natica tincturata Reeve, 1855: synonym of Natica cincta Récluz, 1850
 Natica tosaensis Kuroda, 1961: synonym of Tanea tosaensis (Kuroda, 1961)
 Natica trailli Reeve, 1835: synonym of Natica buriasiensis Récluz, 1844
 Natica tranquilla Melvill & Standen, 1901: synonym of Notocochlis tranquilla (Melvill & Standen, 1901)
 Natica triseriata Say, 1826: synonym of Euspira triseriata (Say, 1826)
 Natica uber Valenciennes, 1832: synonym of Polinices uber (Valenciennes, 1832)
 Natica uberina d'Orbigny, 1842: synonym of Polinices uberinus (d'Orbigny, 1842)
 Natica umbilicata Quoy & Gaimard, 1832: synonym of Eunaticina umbilicata (Quoy & Gaimard, 1832)
 Natica undata Philippi, 1852: synonym of Natica chemnitzii L. Pfeiffer, 1840
 Natica undulata: synonym of Tanea undulata (Röding, 1798)
 Natica unimaculata Reeve, 1855: synonym of Polinices otis (Broderip & G. B. Sowerby I, 1829)
 Natica ustulata G. B. Sowerby II, 1883: synonym of Conuber conicum (Lamarck, 1822)
 Natica valenciennesii Payraudeau, 1826: synonym of Euspira intricata (Donovan, 1804)
 Natica variabilis Reeve, 1855: synonym of Natica adansoni Blainville, 1825
 Natica variolaria Récluz, 1844: synonym of Natica multipunctata Blainville, 1825
 Natica vavaosi Reeve, 1855: synonym of Polinices vavaosi (Reeve, 1855)
 Natica venustula Philippi, 1851: synonym of Tectonatica venustula (Philippi, 1851)
 Natica vesicalis Philippi, 1849: synonym of Glossaulax vesicalis (Philippi, 1849)
 Natica vestalis Philippi, 1851: synonym of Polinices flemingianus (Récluz, 1844)
 Natica violacea G.B. Sowerby I, 1825: synonym of Tectonatica violacea (G.B. Sowerby I, 1825)
 Natica virginea Récluz, 1850: synonym of Polinices uber (Valenciennes, 1832)
 Natica virginea Philippi, 1852: synonym of Polinices flemingianus (Recluz, 1844)
 Natica vitrea Hutton, 1873: synonym of Uberella vitrea (Hutton, 1873)
 Natica vittata (Gmelin, 1791): synonym of Cochlis vittata (Gmelin, 1791)
 Natica whitechurchi Turton, 1932: synonym of Natica simplex Sowerby III, 1897
 Natica xantha Watson, 1881: synonym of Falsilunatia xantha (Watson, 1881)
 Natica zanzebarica Récluz, 1844: synonym of Mammilla sebae (Récluz, 1844)
 Natica zebra Lamarck, 1822 accepted as Tanea undulata (Röding, 1798)
 Natica zelandica Quoy & Gaimard, 1832: synonym of Tanea zelandica (Quoy & Gaimard, 1832)
 Natica zonalis Récluz, 1850: synonym of Naticarius zonalis (Récluz, 1850)
 Natica zonulata Thiele, 1925: synonym of Tectonatica zonulata (Thiele, 1925)

References 

 Vaught, K.C. (1989). A classification of the living Mollusca. American Malacologists: Melbourne, FL (USA). . XII, 195 pp
 Gofas, S.; Le Renard, J.; Bouchet, P. (2001). Mollusca, in: Costello, M.J. et al. (Ed.) (2001). European register of marine species: a check-list of the marine species in Europe and a bibliography of guides to their identification. Collection Patrimoines Naturels, 50: pp. 180–213
 Rolán E., 2005. Malacological Fauna From The Cape Verde Archipelago. Part 1, Polyplacophora and Gastropoda
 Torigoe K. & Inaba A. (2011). Revision on the classification of Recent Naticidae. Bulletin of the Nishinomiya Shell Museum. 7: 133 + 15 pp., 4 pls.

External links
 Malacolog info
 Scopoli, G.A. (1777). Introductio ad historiam naturalem, sistens genera lapidum, plantarum et animalium hactenus detecta, caracteribus essentialibus donata, in tribus divisa, subinde ad leges naturae. Pragae. Wolfgang Gerle. Pp i-x + 1-506
 Risso, A. (1826-1827). Histoire naturelle des principales productions de l'Europe Méridionale et particulièrement de celles des environs de Nice et des Alpes Maritimes. Paris, F.G. Levrault. 3(XVI): 1-480, 14 pls
 Anton, H. E. (1838). Verzeichniss der Conchylien welche sich in der Sammlung von Herrmann Eduard Anton befinden. Herausgegeben von dem Besitzer. Halle: Anton. xvi + 110 pp. 

Naticidae
Articles containing video clips
Extant Eocene first appearances
Gastropod genera